Gyraulus argaeicus is a species of small freshwater snail, an aquatic pulmonate gastropod mollusk in the family Planorbidae, the ram's horn snails.

References

Gyraulus
Gastropods described in 1904